"Do You Miss Me at All" is a song recorded by American recording artist Bridgit Mendler. It premiered via Noisey on November 3, 2016, and was released on November 4, 2016, as the second and final single from her extended play, Nemesis (2016).

Background
In an interview with Noisey's Kim Taylor Bennett, Mendler said about the song "I wrote 'Do You Miss Me at All' while I was driving around Golden Gate Park in San Francisco, missing a boy. Missing someone can be a solitary feeling. You don't always know that the person on the other end feels the same way. This song was my way of coping with the radio silence!"

Critical reception
The song was critically acclaimed by music critics. Mike Wass of Idolator said "Bridgit Mendler relaunched in August with a hazy track called 'Atlantis'. While impressive as a statement of intent, it was perhaps a little too far removed from the radio-friendly anthem 'Ready Or Not' and 'Hurricane'. She got the alt bit right but forgot about the pop. The 23-year-old rectifies that situation today with the adorable 'Do You Miss Me At All'. The production is still weird and wonderful, but the catchy chorus and relatable lyrics make it more accessible." Pigeons and Planes' Charlotte Freitag called it "cathartic" and "a simmering breakup track", while going on to say "over a sultry bass line, sharp percussion, and a swirling synth pad, Mendler sings wistfully about lost love. Her vocal prowess is on full display throughout the song, showing itself in the form of soaring harmonies, impressive runs, and a unique tone quality."

Live performances
Mendler performed her first performance of "Do You Miss Me at All" at the Billboard Studios. She also performed her first performance televised of "Do You Miss Me at All" at the Young Hollywood.

Remixes
Mendler released a remix of the song featuring the American duo Marian Hill on December 2, 2016.
On December 16, 2016, Bridgit released other remix of the song, this time by Pusher.

Music video
On November 18, 2016, a music video for the song was released. Idolator's Rachel Sonis described the music video: "The clip sees Mendler first staring out of the front door of her house, looking for her significant other. We see her croon the song behind glass windows, door screens and even in the shower, as she clearly grows more and more anxious when she realizes he's actually not coming."

Critical reception
Rachel Sonis of Idolator stated "It's an interesting, eerie visual, exploring the dichotomy of how things seem and how they actually are. No wonder we all weave such tangled webs."

Release history

References

2016 singles
2016 songs
Bridgit Mendler songs
Songs written by Bridgit Mendler